The anti-communist resistance in Poland, also referred to as the Polish anti-communist insurrection fought between 1944 and 1953, was an anti-colonialist and anti-imperialist armed struggle by the Polish Underground against the Soviet colonization of Poland at the end of World War II in Europe. The guerrilla warfare conducted by the resistance movement formed during the war, included an array of military attacks launched against communist prisons, state security offices, detention facilities for political prisoners, and prison camps set up across the country by the Stalinist authorities.

In January 1945, the pro-Soviet government installed in Poland by the advancing Red Army declared as "illegal" the Polish anti-Nazi resistance movement, principally the Home Army, and ordered its surviving members to come out into the open while guaranteeing them freedom and safety. Many underground fighters decided to lay down their arms and register, but after doing so, most of them were arrested and thrown in prison. Thousands of them were tortured and later deported into the Soviet Gulag camp system, or tried by kangaroo courts and murdered out of sight after extreme beatings (see, the Uroczysko Baran killing fields among similar others).

As a result of repression, Armia Krajowa (AK) members quickly stopped trusting the new government, and some of them regrouped clandestinely to oppose the new Soviet occupiers. They formed various post-AK resistance organisations, such as Wolność i Niezawisłość ("Freedom and Sovereignty"), and liberated hundreds of political prisoners. They became known as the "cursed soldiers" of the Polish underground, and most were eventually captured or killed by the security services and special assassination squads.

Soviet westward offensive across occupied Poland 
On the night of 3–4 January 1944 the advancing Red Army crossed the former eastern border of the Second Polish Republic in the area of Volhynia (near the village of Rokitno). In several months, they pushed the Wehrmacht further west, reaching the line of the Vistula river on 24 July 1944. The Soviet advance stopped short of Warsaw, while the Armia Krajowa attempted to liberate the Polish capital from the Nazis ahead of the Red Army's offensive. The Warsaw Uprising by forces loyal to the Polish government-in-exile in London was crushed after 63 days.

On 22 July 1944, acting upon orders from Moscow, the Polish communists who arrived in the eastern town of Chełm created a pro-Soviet Committee, which became the Provisional Government of the Republic of Poland after re-locating to Lublin.

After moving to Warsaw in January 1945, and with full political control by Stalin and Soviet sponsorship, the communists abandoned the parliamentary system of prewar Poland and ignored the wishes of the Polish people, basing their new government's power solely on the Red Army's occupation of the country.

Meanwhile, acting together under the command of Soviet General Ivan Serov, the forces of the NKVD, SMERSH and the Polish communist secret service (UB), which was modelled on the Soviet secret police, began countrywide operations against the members of the Armia Krajowa and other Polish resistance units loyal to the government-in-exile. Approximately 25,000 underground soldiers, including 300 Home Army officers, were arrested, disarmed, and interned before October 1944. On 15 October 1944, Lavrentiy Beria signed Order No. 0012266/44, which established NKVD Division 64, whose only task was to fight against the Polish resistance. Tens of thousands of Polish partisans were deported to Siberia. Many members of the Polish underground were given the choice between a lengthy prison sentence, and service in the Soviet-run Polish Armed Forces in the East. Faced with an unacceptable choice, and knowing about the grave fate of their own leaders (see: Trial of the Sixteen), thousands of soldiers of the Home Army (which was officially disbanded on 19 January 1945) and other organizations decided to continue fighting for freedom after the end of World War II.

Polish anti-communist Insurrection 
The situation in Poland in the immediate aftermath of World War II has been described as an all-out civil war,  or near civil war by many historians, as members of the independence movement carried out numerous attacks on both Soviet and Polish communist offices and institutions. In return, the Stalinist authorities carried out brutal pacifications of partisans and civilians, mass arrests (see: Augustów chase 1945), deportations, as well as executions (see: Mokotów Prison murder, Public execution in Dębica) and many secret assassinations.

The anti-communist movement responded with attacks on NKVD and UB camps, such as the Attack on the NKVD Camp in Rembertów. The underground units often engaged in regular battles with the Soviets and Polish communist forces (see: Battle of Kuryłówka). Resistance units loyal to the Polish government-in-exile did not hesitate to attack even large cities, to free their fellow soldiers kept in various prisons and detention camps across Poland.

List of attacks on communist prisons, camps and state security offices 
In 2007, the Institute of National Remembrance Commission for the Prosecution of Crimes against the Polish Nation (IPN), published the Atlas of the Independence Underground in Poland 1944–1956, listing scores of armed attacks on communist prisons after World War II, in which hundreds of political prisoners were freed. The most daring assaults were conducted before October 1946.
 
For a chronological list of anti-Communist operations, please use table-sort buttons.

Polish National Day of Remembrance of the "Cursed Soldiers"

In 2001 the Polish Parliament (Sejm) passed a resolution recognizing the merits of underground organizations and groups fighting for Poland's sovereignty after World War II. The resolution acknowledged their unequal struggle against the Soviet takeover of Poland and paid tribute to the fallen and murdered soldiers and the imprisoned members of all organizations that were persecuted by the postwar communist authorities. This was the first official recognition of such magnitude intended to honour the fighters of the armed anti-communist underground. The bill was signed into law by President Bronisław Komorowski on 9 February 2011 and published in the Poland's Dziennik Ustaw Nr 32 / 160 on 15 February 2011. The National Day of Remembrance of the "Cursed Soldiers" is now commemorated every year in Poland on 1 March.

The original request to establish the Day of Remembrance was submitted in 2009 by Polish war veterans' organizations, including the World Union of Home Army Soldiers (Światowy Związek Żołnierzy Armii Krajowej) and the Association of Soldiers of the National Armed Forces (Związek Żołnierzy Narodowych Sił Zbrojnych). The initiative was backed by local authorities and parliamentary groupings including Poland's two main political parties, Civic Platform and Law and Justice. The legislative initiative for the enactment of the new national holiday was taken in 2010 by the late President Lech Kaczyński.

In popular culture
The novel Ashes and Diamonds by Jerzy Andrzejewski and Andrzej Wajda's dramatization of the book, are devoted to the bloody events in Poland in the immediate aftermath of the Second World War, depicting an operation by anti-communist resistance fighters to assassinate a commissar.

See also
Anti-communist resistance in Poland (1944–1989)
Eastern European anti-Communist insurgencies

Notes and references

 The Atlas of the Independence Underground in Poland 1944–1956, Instytut Pamieci Narodowej, Warszawa-Lublin, 2007. 
 WiN | Freedom and Independence - A Historical Brief by Dr. Janusz Marek Kurtyka, Ph.D., Instytut Pamięci Narodowej, IPN, Poland.
 Doomed Soldiers 1944-1963: The Untold Story
 ŻOŁNIERZE WYKLĘCI, Zapomniani Bohaterowie

Escapees from Polish detention
Poland in World War II
Aftermath of World War II in Poland
Anti-communism in Poland
Polish resistance during World War II
Anti-communist resistance movements in Eastern Europe